John Baker (1722–1792) was a militia leader during the American Revolutionary War. Most notably he led the American militia in the Battle of Thomas Creek on May 17, 1777 against the British army of 250. Baker County, Georgia was named after him.

References 

1731 births
1787 deaths
Georgia (U.S. state) militiamen in the American Revolution